The trailing edge of an aerodynamic surface such as a wing is its rear edge, where the airflow separated by the leading edge meets. Essential flight control surfaces are attached here to control the direction of the departing air flow, and exert a controlling force on the aircraft. Such control surfaces include ailerons on the wings for roll control, elevators on the tailplane controlling pitch, and the rudder on the fin controlling yaw. Elevators and ailerons may be combined as elevons on tailless aircraft.

The shape of the trailing edge is of prime importance in the aerodynamic function of any aerodynamic surface. George Batchelor has written about:
“ ... the remarkable controlling influence exerted by the sharp trailing edge of an aerofoil on the circulation.”Batchelor, G. K. (1967), An Introduction to Fluid Dynamics, p.438, Cambridge University Press.

Other sharp-edged surfaces that are attached to the trailing edges of wings or control surfaces include:

On control surfaces:
trim tabs
servo tabs
anti-servo tabs

Other surfaces:
flaps

Other equipment that may be attached to the trailing edges of wings include:
anti-shock bodies
static dischargers

Trailing edge shape

The trailing edge may either have a triangle-like or cusp-like shape. A trailing edge with a triangle-like shape is also often referred to as a trailing edge that has a finite angle.

References

Aircraft wing design